Qal'at al-Hisn may refer to:

 Hippos, Israel, an archaeological site in the northern Jordan Valley
 Krak des Chevaliers, a Crusader castle in Syria